Vicky Ann McClure (born 8 May 1983) is an English actress, model and presenter. She is known for her roles as Detective Inspector Kate Fleming in the BBC series Line of Duty (2012–present) and Lol Jenkins in Shane Meadows' film This Is England (2006) and its Channel 4 sequel mini-series This Is England '86 (2010), This Is England '88 (2011), and This Is England '90 (2015). Before This is England, she appeared in another of Meadows' films, A Room for Romeo Brass (1999), where she played Ladine. She won the RTS Award and British Academy Television Award for Best Actress for her portrayal of Lol in This is England '86 in 2011.

McClure is also well-known for her role as Karen White in ITV's Broadchurch, and other roles such as in Filth and Wisdom (2008), Hummingbird (2013), Svengali (2013), and The Replacement (2017).

Early life 
Vicky Lee McClure was born on 8 May 1983 in the Wollaton area of Nottingham. Her father was a joiner and her mother was a hairdresser. She has an elder sister, Jenny. McClure was educated at Fernwood School. From the age of three she took dance lessons, and auditioned for the Central Junior Television Workshop when she was 11. Unsuccessful on her first attempt, she was recalled a week later after another child dropped out. While there, she was coached and mentored by fellow Nottingham-born actress Samantha Morton. McClure successfully auditioned for entry to the Italia Conti Academy of Theatre Arts aged 16, but her family could not afford the tuition fees, and she remained at the Workshop.

Career

Television and film
At 15, she was asked to audition for a part in Shane Meadows's independent film A Room for Romeo Brass. The youngest to audition, she was called back, and gained the role of Ladine Brass. She secured an agent, but achieved no parts for four years. After starting a drama foundation course at the local college on leaving school, she left to work in retail, initially for H. Samuel and then Dorothy Perkins. Aged 19 she gave up her acting ambitions for 12 months, but then took a part-time office job in Nottingham to allow her to audition for parts, mostly in London.

After an 18-month period of taking walk-on parts in soaps and daytime TV, McClure then worked on the This is England film and mini-series from 2006 until 2015, portraying the role of Lorraine "Lol" Jenkins. In an April 2007 interview with Time Out, McClure spoke of Meadows approaching her for the role while she was in a pub with Andrew Shim. She described the making of the film, which was highly improvised, as "constant laughing and jokes". In 2011, her performance as Lorraine "Lol" Jenkins in This is England '86 won her the British Academy Television Award for Best Actress and the Royal Television Society Award for Best Actress.

McClure co-starred in the London-based comedy film Filth and Wisdom, the first feature film directed by Madonna. She admitted to being slightly star-struck upon first meeting Madonna, "I tried to act as cool as possible but inside I'm like, "Oh my God; there's Madonna!" You can't help it". The film premièred at the Berlin International Film Festival on 13 February 2008.

McClure was approached and auditioned for a role in ITV soap Emmerdale, but decided to turn it down. She later joined the cast of the British police procedural television series, Line of Duty in 2012 as DC Kate Fleming, continuing in the role in Series 2 (2014), Series 3 (2016), Series 4 (2017) and Series 5 (2019) and Series 6 (2021). In 2013, McClure appeared in the British action-thriller film Hummingbird opposite Jason Statham.

In July 2016, McClure appeared as Winnie Verloc in The Secret Agent, based on the novel of the same name by Joseph Conrad.

McClure starred in the BBC TV thriller The Replacement in 2017. In February 2017, McClure made her professional stage début at Nottingham Playhouse in the fortieth anniversary production of Touched by Stephen Lowe. McClure did voiceover work for the More4 show A Year on the Farm in August 2017.

In 2019, McClure starred as Nicola in the channel 4 drama I Am... with This is England and Line of Duty co-star and friend, Perry Fitzpatrick. She received praise for her portrayal of a woman trapped in an emotionally abusive relationship. Also in 2019, McClure was cast in the TV adaptation of Alex Rider, a series of young adult books by Anthony Horowitz. As of 2020, she plays Mrs. Jones, the deputy head of Mi6 in the show. In December 2019, McClure made a brief appearance as herself in the popular internet comedy series on YouTube, Charity Shop Sue, based in Bulwell, Nottinghamshire.

Music videos 
McClure was also featured alongside Kaya Scodelario, Abbey Butler, Andy Crane and Paul Young in Plan B's music video "She Said". In 2010, McClure appeared in a number of promotional short films for the English cosmetics brand Illamasqua. In 2012, McClure appeared in the video for Jake Bugg's song "Two Fingers" along with Line of Duty co-star Craig Parkinson. On 18 March 2014, McClure appeared on BBC Radio 1's Innuendo Bingo.

Our Dementia Choir 

McClure formed the Our Dementia Choir in 2019, after her late grandmother’s diagnosis of Alzheimer’s taught her the healing power of music. McClure worked on a documentary to raise awareness of the disease, which culminated in a performance in front of 2,000 people at Nottingham’s Royal Concert Hall. She revisited them in 2020, exploring how the pandemic had affected them. She is also an Alzheimer’s Society Ambassador as of 2018, and has taken part in the Alzheimer's Society Memory Walks for many years. 

In 2022, McClure made a further BBC documentary featuring other Dementia gatherings and musical support groups from elsewhere in the UK, and brought her own Dementia Choir to perform with Tom Grennan before 20,000 spectators at the Splendour Festival held in Nottingham's Wollaton Hall grounds.

Personal life 
McClure lives in Nottingham with Welsh director Jonny Owen. On 28 December 2017, they announced their engagement.

In 2013, she opened the Hogarth Teenage Cancer Trust unit at Nottingham City Hospital, and has remained an avid supporter of the Teenage Cancer Trust since.

McClure is close friends with Line of Duty stars Martin Compston, Adrian Dunbar, and writer Jed Mercurio. She has also remained close with her This is England co-stars, with many attending Thomas Turgoose's wedding in 2019. She is also friends with Perry Fitzpatrick, having worked with him on many projects over the last 20 years.

Local recognition 
In 2015, Nottingham Express Transit (NET) named tram 224 after her. On her maiden trip she was asked to leave the tram for fare evasion – having been offered a free ride, she did not have a ticket. As of March 2022, NET had named 37 trams after people with connections local to the Nottingham area.

In August 2022, McClure was awarded an honorary Doctorate of Letters by the University of Nottingham for her work with Our Dementia Choir, including a TV documentary. She was previously awarded an honorary Doctorate of Arts by Nottingham Trent University during 2015, in recognition of her contributions to the acting profession and charitable work in Nottingham.

Filmography

Awards and nominations

References

External links 
 Vicky McClure Official Website
 Vicky McClure at the British Film Institute
 

1983 births
Living people
English film actresses
English television actresses
English female models
Actors from Nottingham
People from Wollaton
Actresses from Nottinghamshire
Best Actress BAFTA Award (television) winners
NME Awards winners
People associated with the University of Nottingham